Joshua Palmer (born 10 August 1991) is an Australian swimmer. He competed in the men's 100 metre breaststroke event at the 2016 Summer Olympics.

References

External links
 

1991 births
Living people
Olympic swimmers of Australia
Swimmers at the 2016 Summer Olympics
Place of birth missing (living people)
Australian male breaststroke swimmers